Jeannette Cornelia van Ravenstijn (born 28 July 1958) is a retired Dutch gymnast. She competed at the 1976 Summer Olympics in all artistic gymnastics events and finished in 11th place with the Dutch team. Her best individual result was 25th place all-around. She was chosen as the most beautiful competitor of the 1976 Games.

She retired from competitions the same year and worked as a model and the television presenter of her program "Body talk" in Amsterdam. The program was devoted to improving the body shape, beauty and fitness.

References

1958 births
Living people
Dutch female artistic gymnasts
Dutch female models
Dutch television presenters
Gymnasts at the 1976 Summer Olympics
Olympic gymnasts of the Netherlands
Sportspeople from Eindhoven
Dutch women television presenters
20th-century Dutch women
20th-century Dutch people
21st-century Dutch women